Moss Point is a city in Jackson County, Mississippi, United States. The population was 12,147 in 2020, a decline from the figure of 13,704 in 2010.  The Moss Point Historic District and several individual buildings are listed on the National Register of Historic Places' Jackson County listings.

History 
On August 29, 2005, Moss Point was hit by the strong east side of Hurricane Katrina, and much of the city was flooded or destroyed (see details below).  Moss Point is home to Trent Lott International Airport and the Mississippi Export Railroad.

Geography
Moss Point is in southeastern Jackson County, on the east side of the Pascagoula River. It is bordered to the south by the city of Pascagoula, the county seat, and to the north by unincorporated Escatawpa. The Escatawpa River flows east–west through the city into the Pascagoula River.

U.S. Route 90 forms the southeastern boundary of Moss Point, leading southwestward into Pascagoula and northeastward to Interstate 10, which runs through the northern part of the Moss Point city limits. I-10 leads west  to the Biloxi area and northeast  to Mobile, Alabama. Mississippi Highways 63 and 613 (Main Street) are north–south roads through Moss Point. Highway 63 leads south to US-90 and north  to Lucedale, while Highway 613 leads south  to the center of Pascagoula and north  to Escatawpa.

Demographics

2020 census

As of the 2020 United States census, there were 12,147 people, 5,102 households, and 3,263 families residing in the city.

2000 census
As of the census of 2000, there were 17,653 people, 6,714 households, and 5,228 families residing in the city. The population density was 634.0 people per square mile (344.8/km). There were 6,237 housing units at an average density of 249.4 per square mile (96.3/km). The racial makeup of the city was 28.04% White, 70.56% African American, 0.15% Native American, 0.21% Asian, 0.03% Pacific Islander, 0.44% from other races, and 0.57% from two or more races. Hispanic or Latino of any race were 1.00% of the population.

There were 5,714 households, out of which 31.6% had children under the age of 18 living with them, 44.7% were married couples living together, 23.7% had a female householder with no husband present, and 26.0% were non-families. 22.8% of all households were made up of individuals, and 8.6% had someone living alone who was 65 years of age or older. The average household size was 2.75 and the average family size was 3.21.

In the city, the population was spread out, with 26.8% under the age of 18, 9.5% from 18 to 24, 25.8% from 25 to 44, 25.3% from 45 to 64, and 12.6% who were 65 years of age or older. The median age was 37 years. For every 100 females, there were 91.2 males. For every 100 females age 18 and over, there were 87.4 males.

The median income for a household in the city was $32,075, and the median income for a family was $37,712. Males had a median income of $31,126 versus $20,550 for females. The per capita income for the city was $15,537. About 15.8% of families and 17.8% of the population were below the poverty line, including 23.2% of those under age 18 and 17.3% of those age 65 or over.

Education
The city is served by the Moss Point School District.

Hurricane Katrina
However, on the east side of Hurricane Katrina, much of Moss Point was flooded or destroyed in one day, by the strong hurricane-force winds which lasted several hours and a storm surge exceeding  in some sections.

Sister city
In the wake of Hurricane Katrina, Burlington, Vermont became the sister city of Moss Point and provided much-needed aid to the city.

Notable people
 Jeramey Anderson, State Representative Mississippi's 110'th House District
 Verlon Biggs, NFL football player, Hall of Famer, and former defensive end for the Washington Redskins from 1965 to 1971 and the New York Jets from 1971 to 1980
 Damarius Bilbo, NFL football player and sports agent, graduated from Moss Point High School in 2001
 Devin Booker, NBA basketball player
 Melvin Booker, graduated from Moss Point High School in 1990,  former NBA basketball player, father of Devin Booker
 John Brock, CEO of Coca-Cola Enterprises (graduated from Moss Point High School in 1967)
 Ray Costict, former linebacker for the New England Patriots from 1977 to 1979
 Ken Farragut, NFL and Ole Miss Hall of Fame football player
 Silky Nutmeg Ganache, contestant on season 11 of RuPaul's Drag Race
 Eddie Glaude, Professor of Religion and African American Studies at Princeton University
 Don Hultz, NFL football player
 Alcender Jackson, NFL football player
 Tom Johnson, NFL defensive tackle for the Minnesota Vikings
 Robert C. Khayat, Chancellor of the University of Mississippi
 David Thomas Roberts, composer and musician
Toni Seawright, 1982 Graduate of Moss Point High; Made history as the first African American to win Miss Mississippi in 1987 (4th Runner-up Miss America 1988)
 Tony Sipp, Major League Baseball Houston Astros - 2x World Series Champion
 Cory Wilson, United States Court of Appeals for the Fifth Circuit judge
 George Wonsley, NFL football player
 Nathan Wonsley, NFL football player

See also

L.N. Dantzler Lumber Company

Notes

External links
 City of Moss Point official website

Cities in Mississippi
Cities in Jackson County, Mississippi
Cities in Pascagoula metropolitan area